is a Japanese manga artist. Since 2010, Ukyō also publishes yaoi manga under the pseudonym .

Works

Series

Short stories

Artbooks

Illustrations

References

External links
 

Living people
Year of birth missing (living people)
Manga artists
Women manga artists
Japanese female comics artists
Female comics writers
Japanese women writers